Berlin Fashion Week (Berliner Modewoche) is a fashion week held twice annually (in January and July) in Berlin, Germany. Since its establishment in July 2007 it has gained great international attention for its many creative young designers who are flourishing in the fashion capital of Berlin. Since July 2011, the event has taken place part in front of the Brandenburg Gate.

Mercedes-Benz is the main sponsor of the fashion week. The next Berlin Fashion Week is planned for 5 September 2022.

Young fashion 
Since the Spring/Summer 2012 season, Mercedes-Benz Fashion Week features young international talents in an exclusive show in cooperation with Elle. Fashion entrepreneurs can vie in the Start your Fashion Business competition. Another important event for young designers is the Designer for Tomorrow Award, which is held every summer season. A jury, which famous designer Marc Jacobs belongs to, chooses a winner who will be able to present his own show in the next winter season. Another specialty is the Berlin U-Bahn fashion show, that takes place in a chartered train of the U5 line.

Fashion fairs 
Different trade fairs are an essential part of the Berlin Fashion Week, such as BREAD & BUTTER, Premium Fair, Bright Tradeshow, (capsule), Show&Order, PanoramaBerlin and The Gallery Berlin. Widely publicly available are the showfloors at Mercedes-Benz showfloor, Showfloor Berlin, Lavera Showfloor, GREENshowroom and Ethical Fashion Show.

StyleNite 
The StyleNite by Berlin-based designer Michael Michalsky takes place at the Berlin Fashion Show and became globally famous for its unusual performances of different art disciplines combined with state-of-the-art fashion. Musicians like Lady Gaga, HURTS, Alphaville and Icona Pop performed at StyleNites. Michalsky also chooses non-mainstream ways when it comes to selecting the models, as he also appointed disabled models like Mario Galla (with a leg prosthesis) or models aged above 60 like Eveline Hall. The famed female model Toni Garrn is part of every show.

See also 

German fashion
London Fashion Week
Milan Fashion Week
New York Fashion Week
Paris Fashion Week
Shanghai Fashion Week
Jakarta Fashion Week
Copenhagen Fashion Week

References

External links 

 Official website Fashion Week Berlin
 Official website Mercedes-Benz Fashion Week Berlin
 Official YouTube channel of Berlin Fashion Week
 Highlights of Berlin Fashion Week Spring/Summer 2014 (includes catwalk videos)

Fashion events in Germany
2007 establishments in Germany
Recurring events established in 2007
German fashion
Annual events in Berlin
Fashion weeks